Christopher James Pickering is an Australian alternative country singer, songwriter and guitarist based in Melbourne, Australia.

Life 
Until June 2004, Chris drummed and sang for the Boat People. 

Pickering released his debut solo EP, Hard to Find in 2004, and his debut album A Safer Place in 2005. His 2006 EP Ghost City was produced by ARIA Award-winning producer Magoo.

Pickering's "Edge of the Earth" was nominated for the 7th Annual Independent Music Awards for Alternative Country Song of the year. In 2008, Pickering showcased at the South by Southwest (SxSW) festival in Austin, Texas. In 2009, he represented Queensland at the North American Folk Music and Dance Alliance festival in Memphis, Tennessee. In 2010, Pickering released Work of Fiction,  produced by Don Nix and recorded in studios in Memphis Tennessee and Brisbane Queensland.

In 2016, Pickering released Canyons, an album of songs recorded both at Bomb Shelter Studios in Nashville, Tennessee, and Joshua Tree, California, at Hicksville Trailer Park. The Hicksville sessions were co-produced with Adrian Mauro, and the Nashville Sessions co-produced with Andrija Tokic.

From 2014, he has been based in Melbourne, Australia, where he is also Head of Music at JMC Academy's Melbourne Campus.

Discography

Albums

Extended plays

Awards

Queensland Music Awards
The Queensland Music Awards (previously known as Q Song Awards) are annual awards celebrating Queensland, Australia's brightest emerging artists and established legends. They commenced in 2006.

 (wins only)
|-
| 2006
| "Better Off"
| Country Song of the Year
| 
|-
| 2007
| "The Humming Song" 
| Country Song of the Year 
| 
|}

References

External links
ChrisPickering.net (official website)

Australian alternative country singers
Australian country singers
Australian singer-songwriters
Living people
Year of birth missing (living people)